16α-Hydroxydehydroepiandrosterone (16α-hydroxy-DHEA or 16α-OH-DHEA) is an endogenous metabolite of dehydroepiandrosterone (DHEA). Both 16α-OH-DHEA and its 3β-sulfate ester, 16α-OH-DHEA-S, are intermediates in the biosynthesis of estriol from dehydroepiandrosterone (DHEA). 16α-OH-DHEA has estrogenic activity.

See also
 15α-Hydroxydehydroepiandrosterone
 16α-Hydroxyandrostenedione
 16α-Hydroxyestrone
 Cetadiol

References

Androstanes
Estrogens